Leucopogon malayanus is a plant in the family Ericaceae native to Cambodia, Malaya, Myanmar, Thailand, and Vietnam.  However occurrence data from GBIF, shows it occurring in Queensland (Australia), Indonesia, Malaysia, Singapore, Brunei and India. It was first described by  William Jack in 1820, who "found (it) abundantly at Singapore".

There are two subspecies:

 Leucopogon malayanus subsp. novoguineensis (Sleumer) Pedley
 Leucopogon malayanus subsp. malayanus

Description

Leucopogon malayanus subsp. novoguineensis
This plant is usually found as a small multistemmed windswept tree but also occurs as a shrub. The leaves may be stalked or without stalks and vary considerably in size (40-120 mm  by 8-20 mm). There are about 8-12 parallel leaf veins but no obvious midrib. The flowers occur in spikes and the calyx lobes are about 2 by 1.9 mm and have hairy margins. The stamen filaments are about 1.5 mm long with anthers about 0.6 by 0.2 mm. The ovary has 8-10 locules. The fruits are squashed globules (about 5-6 by 7-9 mm diameter), and the calyx persists at the base. This subspecies is found only in north-east Queensland and New Guinea.

Leucopogon malayanus subsp. malayanus
This subspecies is called Styphelia malayana var. malayana by Hermann Sleumer. 

It differs from L. malayanus subsp. novoguineensis in that it does not have the long hairs at the top of the ovary and at the base of the style of L. malayanus subsp. novoguineensis. Additionally, the ranges of the two subspecies do not overlap.

References

malayanus
Ericales of Australia
Flora of New Guinea
Flora of Indo-China
Flora of Malesia
Plants described in 1820